In functional and convex analysis, and related disciplines of mathematics, the polar set  is a special convex set associated to any subset  of a vector space  lying in the dual space  

Definitions

There are at least three competing definitions of the polar of a set, originating in projective geometry and convex analysis. 

Functional analytic definition

Absolute polar

Suppose that  is a pairing. 
 

where  denotes the image of the set  under the map  defined by  

This is an affine shift of the geometric definition; 
it has the useful characterization that the functional-analytic polar of the unit ball (in ) is precisely the unit ball (in ). 

 

in practice, this reuse of notation and of the word "polar" rarely causes any issues (such as ambiguity) and many authors do not even use the word "prepolar". 

that is,

Real polar

As with the absolute prepolar, the real prepolar is usually called the real polar and is also denoted by  
It's important to note that some authors (e.g. [Schaefer 1999]) define "polar" to mean "real polar" (rather than "absolute polar", as is done in this article) and use the notation  for it (rather than the notation  that is used in this article and in [Narici 2011]). 

it is equal to the -closure of the convex hull of  

In general, it is possible that  but equality will hold if  is balanced. 
Furthermore,  where  denotes the balanced hull of

Competing definitions

The definition of the "polar" of a set is not universally agreed upon. 
Although this article defined "polar" to mean "absolute polar", some authors define "polar" to mean "real polar" and other authors use still other definitions. 
No matter how an author defines "polar", the notation  almost always represents  choice of the definition (so the meaning of the notation  may vary from source to source). 

where the notation  is  standard notation. 

We now briefly discuss how these various definitions relate to one another and when they are equivalent. 

It is always the case that

If  is a symmetric set (that is,  or equivalently) then  where if in addition  is real-valued then 

where if in addition  for all real  then 

In particular, all definitions of the polar of  agree when  is a balanced set (which is often, but not always, the case) so that often, which of these competing definitions is used is immaterial. 
However, these difference in the definitions of the "polar" of a set  do sometimes introduce subtle or important technical differences when  is not necessarily balanced.

Specialization for the canonical duality

Algebraic dual space

For any subset  let
 

If  are any subsets then  and  where  denotes the convex balanced hull of  
If  denotes the union of all closures  as  varies over all finite dimensional vector subspaces of  then  (see this footnote 
for an explanation). 
If  is an absorbing subset of  then by the Banach–Alaoglu theorem,  is a weak-* compact subset of  

  defined by   

is a seminorm on  If  then by definition of the supremum,  so that the map  defined above would not be real-valued and consequently, it would not be a seminorm. 

Continuous dual space

Suppose that  is a topological vector space (TVS) with continuous dual space  
The important special case where  and the brackets represent the canonical map:

is now considered. 
The triple  is the called the  associated with  

The polar of a subset  with respect to this canonical pairing is:
 

The Banach–Alaoglu theorem states that if  is a neighborhood of the origin in  then  and this polar set is a compact subset of the continuous dual space  when  is endowed with the weak-* topology (also known as the topology of pointwise convergence). 

If  satisfies  for all scalars  of unit length then one may replace the absolute value signs with  so that:

where 

The bipolar theorem characterizes the bipolar of a subset of a topological vector space. 

Geometric definition for cones

The polar cone of a convex cone  is the set

This definition gives a duality on points and hyperplanes, writing the latter as the intersection of two oppositely-oriented half-spaces. 
The polar hyperplane of a point  is the locus ; 
the dual relationship for a hyperplane yields that hyperplane's polar point.

Some authors (confusingly) call a dual cone the polar cone; we will not follow that convention in this article.

Properties

Unless stated otherwise,  will be a pairing. 
The topology  is the weak-* topology on  while  is the weak topology on  
The term "polar" will refer to the  polar. 

 The (absolute) polar of a set is convex and balanced.
 If  for all scalars  of unit length then 
 The bipolar  of a set  is the -closed convex hull of  that is the smallest -closed and convex set containing both  and  
 Similarly, the bidual cone of a cone  is the -closed conic hull of 
 If  is a base at the origin for a TVS  then 
 Conversely, if  is a locally convex TVS then the polars (taken with respect to ) of any fundamental family of equicontinuous subsets of  form a neighborhood base of the origin in 
 Let  be a TVS with a topology  Then  is a locally convex TVS topology if and only if  is the topology of uniform convergence on the equicontinuous subsets of  
The last two results explain why equicontinuous subsets of the continuous dual space play such a prominent role in the modern theory of functional analysis: because equicontinuous subsets encapsulate all information about the locally convex space 's original topology.

Set relations

  and 
 For all scalars   and for all real   and 
  However, for the real polar we have 
 For any finite collection of sets  
 If  then   and 
 An immediate corollary is that ; equality necessarily holds when  is finite and may fail to hold if  is infinite.
  and 
 If  is a cone in  then 
 If  then 

See also

Notes

References

Bibliography

  
  
  
  
  
  
  

Functional analysis
Linear functionals
Topological vector spaces